"Black Metallic" is the debut single by English alternative rock band Catherine Wheel, released on 11 November 1991 by Fontana Records. It was later included on the band's 1992 debut studio album Ferment.

The song "broke, and betrothed Catherine Wheel to the American public", hitting No. 9 on Billboard's Modern Rock Tracks chart and earning "massive attention" due to the band's yearlong American tour and heavy rotation of the song's video on MTV. "Black Metallic" also reached No. 68 on the UK Singles Chart.

Reception
AllMusic critic Amy Hanson said that "Black Metallic" "could probably be counted in the ranks of ballad -- albeit one with a droning guitar and a subsonic wailing that cudgeled the listener over the head, at the same time as caressing them to ecstasy," and noted, "With a deeply textured guitar drone and wallop to lead the way, and backed by a forcefully lazy drum beat, Rob Dickinson's vocals, which he renders quite tender here, play beautifully off the noise behind in an ebb and flow which drains to nothing by the end of the song -- a seven-minute epic".

Charts

References

1991 debut singles
1991 songs
Fontana Records singles
Catherine Wheel songs